Jack's Mountain is a hill on East Falkland, in the Falkland Islands.

References

Mountains of East Falkland